The Rancho Cordova Grapevine-Independent, formerly the Rancho Cordova Grapevine, is the main newspaper of Rancho Cordova, California (a suburb east of Sacramento). This weekly publication has operated continuously since 1968.

History
The Grapevine was formed in 1968.  Staff writer Doug Hawkes bought the publication from Robert and Jane Mingori after the Mingoris had owned it for three years in the late 60’s after they had purchased it from Paul and Dorothy Hronek, and subsequently Hawkes sold it to Robert Ling in 1989.  Ling sold the paper to Herburger Publications of Galt, California. Herburger Publications then sold the newspaper to Kris Middaugh of Rancho Cordova. Kris Middaugh then sold the newspaper to Paul Scholl, owner of the Messenger Publishing Group in 2013. The Messenger Publishing Group publishes five other local newspapers in the Sacramento region.

The Grapevine Independent has a weekly distribution of approximately 7,000 every Friday.

In addition to its weekly print edition, the newspaper also offers an online edition at www.RanchoCordovaIndependent.com.

External links
Official website

Weekly newspapers published in California
Rancho Cordova, California
Mass media in Sacramento County, California
1968 establishments in California
Publications established in 1968